General Office of the State Council of the People's Republic of China is an administrative agency of the State Council which assists the leaders with the day to day administrative operations of the Chinese government.

It is also known as State Council General Office or "State Office".

Functions 
The main powers of the State Council:

 Preparation of the State Council meeting to help the leadership and organization of the State Council meeting make decisions on state matters
 To help the leadership and council in the preparation or implement audit and  releasing documents
 To consult and report to the leaders of the State Council for approval in regards to audits carried out at the State Council level departments, municipalities, provinces, autonomous region, autonomous region.
 Advise the state council on sensitive issues between the departments under the State Council.
 Manage the relationship between the central government and local government authorities on the implementation on state council directives. 
 Help the State Council coordinate in national emergencies and major crises.
 Public relations from the people directly

References

External links

See also 
 General Offices
 General Office of the Chinese Communist Party
 General Office of the Central Military Commission

State Council of the People's Republic of China
Government agencies of China